St. Patrick's Roman Catholic Church is located in Adell, Wisconsin, a Gothic Revival-styled church with exterior of split fieldstone, built in 1877 to serve the surrounding Irish-immigrant community. It was added to the National Register of Historic Places in 1983 for its architectural significance.

Images

References

Churches on the National Register of Historic Places in Wisconsin
Former Roman Catholic church buildings in Wisconsin
Churches in Sheboygan County, Wisconsin
Roman Catholic churches completed in 1877
Gothic Revival church buildings in Wisconsin
Churches in the Roman Catholic Archdiocese of Milwaukee
National Register of Historic Places in Sheboygan County, Wisconsin
19th-century Roman Catholic church buildings in the United States
1877 establishments in Wisconsin